Martin Wagner (1885–1957) was a German architect, city planner, and author, best known as the driving force behind the construction of modernist housing projects in interwar Berlin.  


Germany  
Tall, angular, loyally Socialist, and uncompromising in his opinions, Wagner was educated at the Technical University of Berlin and worked as draftsman in the office of planner Hermann Muthesius, before being appointed the City Building Commissioner for Schöneberg in 1918 (now an inner-city area of Berlin).  

He served as the chief city planner of Berlin from 1925, and most of Berlin's Modernist Housing Estates, now recognized as a UNESCO World Heritage Site, were constructed under his leadership.  In 1924 he founded the building society , which was responsible for seventy percent of Berlin's housing built from 1924 through 1933, amounting to many thousands of residential units.  

Wagner was more planner than design-architect, and few individual building designs are directly attributable to him.  His role was parallel to Ernst May's role in Frankfurt-am-Main:  the leader of a large-scale effort to standardize building requirements, rationalize construction practice, organize industrial suppliers and labor unions, all in the effort to mass-produce housing.  

In his German projects Wagner was a frequent collaborator with German landscape architect Leberecht Migge.  

As the Nazis came to power through the early 1930s, Wagner fell under increasing pressure and suspicion as a committed Social Democrat and longtime member of the SPD.  He was expelled from the Deutscher Werkbund in 1933 and decided to leave the country.  He spent three years in Turkey in exile.  His work there included the city plan for Ankara, and a brief reunion with colleague Bruno Taut.

United States  
In 1938 Wagner took a position teaching city planning at the Harvard Graduate School of Design, his immigration to the United States assisted by his colleague Walter Gropius.  Among Wagner's students at the GSD were William Wurster and Catherine Bauer.  

But already by 1940, his relationship with Gropius was strained.  Wagner complained of Gropius abandoning the underlying social principles of modernism, and practicing modernism only as a style.  On the other hand, Wagner's purism may not have been serving him well:  in 1944 he produced a new city plan for Boston which called for a complete razing and restructuring of the city's entire downtown area.  

Wagner took American citizenship in 1944; he served as professor at the GSD until retirement in 1951. Wagner's son Bernard Wagner was also an architect.

See also
 Großsiedlung Siemensstadt
 Britz
 Strandbad Wannsee

External links 
  (in German)
 Houser, by H. Peter Oberlander, Eva Newbrun, Martin Meyerson

1885 births
1957 deaths
19th-century German architects
Housing in Germany
German emigrants to the United States
Harvard Graduate School of Design faculty
20th-century German architects